The 2011 Shoot-Out was a curling bonspiel that was held from September 15 to 18 at the Saville Sports Centre in Edmonton, Alberta as part of the 2011–12 World Curling Tour. The purse for the men's and women's events was CAD$26,000 and CAD$20,000, respectively.

Men

Teams

Round-robin standings

Playoffs

Women

Teams

Round-robin standings

Playoffs

External links
Event Host Site: Saville Sports Centre

2011 in Canadian curling
2011 in Alberta
September 2011 sports events in Canada
Sport in Edmonton
Curling in Alberta
The Shoot-Out